Estrella is a mixed-use master-planned community located in Goodyear, Arizona, in the United States. Encompassing roughly 20,000 acres, the lakeside community is nestled in the foothills of the Sierra Estrella Mountains, in the Sonoran Desert Valley. Located approximately 17 miles west of Phoenix off of the I-10 and Estrella Parkway, the community offers access to the Greater Metro-Phoenix area. 
Currently, Estrella is a home to more than 40,000 residents ranging from young couples to retirees. The community regularly hosts events and has amenities including parks, trails, and open space. Estrella consists of three distinct communities: Mountain Ranch, Montecito, and the gated 55-plus community, CantaMia.

The community was recognized in Arizona Foothills Magazine's "Best of Our Valley 2015" list as the best Master-Plan Community for Children.

History

In 1984, the Estrella property, a federal land reserve, was released to private ownership by the government. In 1985, Charles Keating of the American Continental Corporation purchased the land to create a master-planned community. In 1986, construction began on the North and South lakes, which total 72 acres combined, and in 1988 the Estrella Master-Planned Community held its official grand opening.

References

External links
City of Goodyear home page

Populated places in Maricopa County, Arizona
Neighborhoods in Arizona
Populated places established in 1989
Goodyear, Arizona